The Blériot 195 was a French monoplane mail-carrier designed and built by Blériot Aéronautique, the one aircraft built was modified a number of times but failed to enter production.

Design and development
The Blériot 195 was a large low-wing cantilever monoplane designed for use on mail flights across the North Atlantic. It was powered by four  Hispano-Suiza 6Mb inline piston engines, which were mounted in tandem pairs above the wing on a complex of struts. Designated the 195/2 landplane, it first flew on 9 March 1929. By the end of 1929, it had been re-designated the 195/3 and test flown with twin floats. It was re-designated again as the 195/4 in early 1930, when it was fitted with  Gnome-Rhone Titan engines. It was put forward to meet a requirement for a seaplane to operate a mail service between Marseilles and Algiers, but in the end none of the designs submitted were accepted and the 195 was placed into storage.

In April 1931 it was brought out of storage and modified to be a landplane and designated the 195/6; it was then tested by Air Union as a cargo aircraft. It did not gain a certificate of airworthiness as a cargo carrier and was withdrawn from use.

Variants
195/2
Mail-carrier landplane with four 250hp Hispano-Suiza 6Mb piston engines.
195/3
The 195/2 modified as a floatplane.
195/4
The 195/3 re-engined with four 230hp Gnome-Rhône 5Kd Titan engines.
195/6
195/4 modified to a landplane.

Specifications (195/2)

See also

References

Notes

Bibliography

1920s French mailplanes
195
Floatplanes
Four-engined push-pull aircraft
Low-wing aircraft
Aircraft first flown in 1929